Bouriema Kimba (1968 – 21 April 2013) was a former Nigerien sprinter who competed in the men's 100m competition at the 1996 Summer Olympics. He recorded an 11.24, not enough to qualify for the next round past the heats. His personal best is 10.87, set in 1995. In the 1992 Summer Olympics, he recorded a 22.49 in the 200m. He later served as the Nigerien national sprint coach. In 2013, he was killed in a road accident.

References

1968 births
2013 deaths
Nigerien male sprinters
Athletes (track and field) at the 1992 Summer Olympics
Athletes (track and field) at the 1996 Summer Olympics
Olympic athletes of Niger